YUL–Montréal–Trudeau Airport is an under-construction Réseau express métropolitain (REM) station in the city of Dorval, Quebec, Canada, on the grounds of Montréal–Trudeau International Airport. Scheduled to open in 2027, it is planned to be operated by CDPQ Infra and to serve as a terminal station on the Airport branch of the REM.

References

Réseau express métropolitain railway stations
Buildings and structures in Dorval
Airport railway stations in Canada
Railway stations in Montreal
station
Railway stations scheduled to open in 2025
Transport in Dorval